The discography of Buck-Tick includes 23 studio albums, 4 live albums, 2 extended plays, 43 singles, and 39 video albums. Formed in 1983 in Fujioka, Gunma, the Japanese rock band has consisted of Atsushi Sakurai (lead vocals), Hisashi Imai (guitar), Hidehiko Hoshino (guitar), Yutaka Higuchi (bass) and Toll Yagami (drums) since 1985. In their three decade career, nearly all of their albums have reached the top ten on the charts and they have experimented with many different genres of music, including punk, dark wave, electronic, industrial, gothic and straight rock. Buck-Tick are commonly credited as one of the founders of the visual kei movement.

Albums

Mini albums/EPs

Remix albums

Live albums

Compilation albums

Tribute albums

V.A. Compilations

Singles

Videos

References

External links
Official website discography

Discography
Discographies of Japanese artists
Rock music group discographies